Lepidochrysops dukei, the Duke's blue, is a butterfly of the family Lycaenidae. It is found in South Africa, where it is found in the Western Cape.

The wingspan is about 28–29 mm. Adults are on wing from August to October on low altitudes and from mid-November to January at high altitudes. There is one extended generation per year.

The larvae feed on weevil galls on the flowers of Selago fruticosa.

References

Butterflies described in 1965
Lepidochrysops
Endemic butterflies of South Africa